Túnel de la Atlántida is the world's longest known volcanic submarine lava tube located in the Canary Islands off the coast of North Africa. It is the underwater portion of the Cueva de los Verdes lava tube at Haría, Las Palmas. The 5,000-foot (1,500 metre) long tube formed some 20,000 years ago when the Monte Corona volcano erupted on the island of Lanzarote. The erupted molten rock flowed across the land and into the ocean.

References

Lava tubes
Lanzarote
Volcanism of the Canary Islands
Caves of the Canary Islands